The Supercoppa Primavera is an Italian youth teams football match played by the winners of the Campionato Primavera championship and the winners of the Coppa Italia Primavera at the beginning of the season.

The competition has been held since 2004.

Winners

Performance by club

See also
Campionato Nazionale Primavera
Coppa Italia Primavera

External links
Super Coppa Primavera at 

Youth football competitions in Italy
Under-20 association football